Wrestling competitions at the 2008 Summer Olympics in Beijing, China, were held at the China Agricultural University Gymnasium from 12–21 August 2008. It was split into two disciplines, Freestyle and Greco-Roman which are further divided into different weight categories. Men competed in both disciplines whereas women only took part in the freestyle events with 18 gold medals being awarded. This was the second Olympics with women's wrestling as an event.

Qualification

Medalists

Men's freestyle

Men's Greco-Roman

Women's freestyle

 Vasyl Fedoryshyn of Ukraine originally won the silver medal, but was disqualified in 2016 after failing an anti-doping retest. United World Wrestling has reallocated medals accordingly.
 Soslan Tigiev of Uzbekistan originally won the silver medal, but was disqualified in 2016 after failing an anti-doping retest. United World Wrestling has reallocated medals accordingly.
 Taimuraz Tigiyev of Kazakhstan originally won the silver medal, but was disqualified in 2016 after failing an anti-doping retest. United World Wrestling has reallocated medals accordingly.
 Artur Taymazov of Uzbekistan originally won the gold medal, but was disqualified in 2016 after failing an anti-doping retest. United World Wrestling has reallocated medals accordingly.
 Vitaliy Rahimov of Azerbaijan originally won the silver medal, but was disqualified in 2016 after failing an anti-doping retest. United World Wrestling has reallocated medals accordingly.
Ara Abrahamian of Sweden originally won one of the two bronze medals, but was disqualified by the IOC after he walked off the podium and placed his medal in the center of the mat to protest a judge's decision which cost him his match against the eventual gold medallist, Andrea Minguzzi from Italy. The Court of Arbitration for Sport held a hearing based on the request, which was issued by Abrahamian and the Swedish Olympic Committee against the FILA. Preceding the hearing, CAS declared in a statement that Abrahamian and the SOC "do not seek from the CAS any particular relief" regarding the ranking of the medals or a review of the IOC decision to exclude Abrahamian from the Games. Following the CAS, issued an arbitration strongly criticizing FILA. While not challenging the outcome of the match or the technical judgments, the arbitration stated that the FILA was required to provide an appeal jury capable to deal promptly with the claims of the athletes. The chairman of the SOC, Stefan Lindeberg, commented that the decision once and for all shows that FILA did not act correctly and that they did not follow their own rules of fair play.
 Asset Mambetov of Kazakhstan originally won one of the two bronze medals, but was disqualified in 2016 after failing an anti-doping retest. United World Wrestling has reallocated medals accordingly.
 Khasan Baroev of Russia originally won the silver medal, but was disqualified in 2016 after failing an anti-doping retest. United World Wrestling has reallocated medals accordingly.

Medal table

Participating nations
A total of 344 wrestlers from 59 nations competed at the Beijing Games:

References

U.S. Olympic Team & Weight Class Previews
International Federation of Associated Wrestling Styles
Fila Wrestling Beijing 2008
Olympic Committee

External links
Wrestling – Official Results Book

 
2008 Summer Olympics events
2008
O
International wrestling competitions hosted by China